Good Time may refer to:

 Good Time (film), a 2017 American crime film by the Safdie brothers
 Good conduct time, a sentence reduction for good behavior in prison

Music

Albums
 Good Time (Alan Jackson album), 2008, or the title song (see below)
 Good Time (Niko Moon album), 2021
 Good Time (soundtrack), by Oneohtrix Point Never from the 2017 film, or the title song (see below)
 A Good Time, by Davido, 2019
 Good Time, by Ranky Tanky, 2019
 Good Time, an EP by Niko Moon, 2020, or the title song (see below)

Songs
 "Good Time" (Alan Jackson song), 2008
 "Good Time" (American Spring song), 1972
 "Good Time" (Inna song), 2014
 "Good Time" (Jin Akanishi song), 2014
 "Good Time" (Justice Crew song), 2015
 "Good Time" (Luca Hänni and Christopher S song), 2014
 "Good Time" (Niko Moon song), 2020
 "Good Time" (Owl City and Carly Rae Jepsen song), 2012
 "Good Time" (Paris Hilton song), 2013
 "Good Time", by A, 2003
 "Good Time", by Brazilian Girls from New York City, 2008
 "Good Time", by Crystal Castles from Crystal Castles, 2008
 "Good Time", by J Hus from Common Sense, 2017
 "Good Time", by Leroy from Music from Scrubs, 2002
 "Good Time", by Oneohtrix Point Never from Good Time, 2017

See also
 Good Times (disambiguation)